WNYC-FM (93.9 MHz) is a non-profit, non-commercial, public radio station licensed to New York City. It is owned by New York Public Radio along with WNYC (AM), Newark, New Jersey-licensed classical music outlet WQXR-FM (105.9 MHz), New Jersey Public Radio, and the Jerome L. Greene Performance Space.
New York Public Radio is a not-for-profit corporation, incorporated in 1979, and is a publicly supported organization. The station broadcasts from studios and offices located in the Hudson Square neighborhood in lower Manhattan. WNYC-FM's transmitter is located at the Empire State Building. The station serves the New York metropolitan area.

History

Early years (1943–1994)
WNYC-FM began regularly scheduled broadcasts on the FM band on March 13, 1943 at 43.9 MHz as the sister station to WNYC. Known originally as W39NY, the FM outlet adopted its present WNYC-FM identity and its present frequency of 93.9 MHz within a few years. In 1961 the pair were joined by a television operation, as WUHF (channel 31) took to the air in an experimental format. The following year the station was renamed WNYC-TV.

The Municipal Broadcasting System (which was renamed the WNYC Communications Group in 1989) helped to form National Public Radio in 1971, and the WNYC stations were among the 90 stations that carried the inaugural broadcast of All Things Considered later that year.

The station's ownership by the City meant that it was occasionally subject to the whims of various mayors. As part of a crackdown on prostitution in 1979, then-Mayor Ed Koch tried to use WNYC to broadcast the names of "johns" arrested for soliciting. Announcers threatened a walkout and station management refused to comply with the idea; after one broadcast the idea was abandoned. See John Hour.

Independence from the City (1994–present)
Shortly after assuming the mayoralty in 1994, Rudolph W. Giuliani announced he was considering selling WNYC-AM-FM. Giuliani believed that broadcasting was no longer essential as a municipal service, and that the financial compensation from selling the stations could be used to help the City cover budget shortfalls. The final decision was made in March 1995: while the City opted to divest WNYC-TV (now WPXN-TV) through a blind auction to commercial buyers, WNYC-AM-FM was sold to the WNYC Foundation for $20 million over a six-year period, far less than what the stations could have been sold for if they were placed on the open market. While the sale put an end to the occasional political intrusions of the past, it required the WNYC Foundation to embark on a major appeal towards listeners, other foundations, and private benefactors. The station's audience and budget have continued to grow since the split from the City.

The terrorist attacks of September 11, 2001 destroyed WNYC-FM's transmitter atop the World Trade Center. WNYC-AM-FM's studios, in the nearby Manhattan Municipal Building, had to be evacuated and station staff was unable to return to its offices for three weeks. The FM signal was knocked off the air for a time. WNYC-FM temporarily moved to studios at National Public Radio's New York bureau in midtown Manhattan, where it broadcast on its still operating AM signal transmitting from towers in Kearny, New Jersey and by a live Internet stream. The stations eventually returned to the Municipal Building.

Move to new studios (2008)
On June 16, 2008 NYPR moved from its  of rent-free space scattered on eight floors of the Manhattan Municipal Building to a new location on Varick Street, near the Holland Tunnel. The station now occupies three and a half floors of a 12-story former printing building. The number of recording studios and booths has doubled, to 31. There is a new 140-seat, street-level studio for live broadcasts, concerts and public forums and an expansion of the newsroom of over 60 journalists.

Renovation, construction, rent and operating costs for the new Varick Street location amounted to $45 million. In addition to raising these funds, NYPR raised money for a one-time fund of $12.5 million to cover the cost of creating 40 more hours of new programming and three new shows. The total cost of $57.5 million for both the move and programming is nearly three times the $20 million the station had to raise over seven years to buy its licenses from the City in 1997.

Acquisition of WQXR (2009)
On October 8, 2009 WNYC took control of classical music station WQXR-FM, then at 96.3. WQXR's intellectual property (call letters and format) was acquired from the New York Times Company as part of a three-way transaction with Univision Radio. WNYC also purchased the 105.9 FM frequency of Univision's WCAA (now WXNY-FM). WQXR-FM's classical format moved to 105.9 and WXNY's Spanish Tropical format debuted at 96.3. The deal resulted in WQXR becoming a non-commercial station. With WQXR as a co-owned 24-hour classical station, WNYC-FM dropped its remaining classical music programming to become a full-time news/talk station.

Past personalities
Past WNYC radio personalities include H. V. Kaltenborn, who hosted radio's first quiz program on WNYC in 1926, the Brooklyn Daily Eagles Current Events Bee, a forerunner to shows like National Public Radio's Wait Wait... Don't Tell Me! In its early years the station lacked funds for a record library and would borrow albums from record stores around the Manhattan Municipal Building, where its studios were located. Legend has it, a listener began lending classical records to the station and in 1929, WNYC began broadcast of Masterwork Hour, radio's first program of recorded classical music.

Following the U.S. entry into World War II, then-mayor Fiorello H. La Guardia made use of the station every Sunday in his Talk to the People program. During a lengthy newspaper workers strike, La Guardia also used the WNYC airwaves to read the latest comic strips to local youngsters while they were not available in New York.

Margaret Juntwait, an announcer and classical music host at WNYC for 15 years, left for the Metropolitan Opera in September 2006. Prior to her death in 2015, Juntwait served as announcer for the Met's Saturday afternoon radio broadcasts, the first woman to hold the position and only the third regular announcer of the long-standing broadcast series, which was launched in 1931. John Schaefer, a music show host at WNYC since 1982, has written liner notes for more than 100 albums, for everyone from Yo-Yo Ma to Terry Riley and was named a "New York influential" by New York Magazine in 2006.

Programming
WNYC produces 100 hours a week of its own programming, including nationally syndicated shows such as On the Media, The New Yorker Radio Hour, and Radiolab, as well as local news and interview shows that include The Brian Lehrer Show, All of It with Alison Stewart, and Soundcheck. The entire schedule is streamed live over the internet and several shows also air over Sirius XM. As a result, the station receives listener calls from far-flung states and even has international listeners. Many of these shows are simulcast on its AM sister.

WNYC has a local news team of 38 journalists, producers, editors, and other broadcasting professionals.

 On the Media is a nationally syndicated, weekly one-hour program hosted by Brooke Gladstone and Bob Garfield, formerly of Advertising Age, covering the media and its effect on American culture and society. Many stories investigate how events of the past week were covered by the press. Stories also regularly cover such topics as video news releases, net neutrality, media consolidation, censorship, freedom of the press, spin, and how the media is changing with technology. It won a Peabody Award in 2004.
 The Brian Lehrer Show is a two-hour weekday talk show covering local and national current events and social issues hosted by Brian Lehrer, a former anchor and reporter for NBC Radio Network. It won a Peabody Award in 2007 "for facilitating reasoned conversation about critical issues and opening it up to everyone within earshot."
 All of It with Alison Stewart, covers culture in the broadest sense - religion, food, language, music etc.

WNYC broadcasts the major daily news programs produced by NPR, including Morning Edition and All Things Considered, as well as the BBC World Service and selected programs from Public Radio Exchange including This American Life.

Other WNYC and WNYC Studios produced programs and podcasts include:

Trump, Inc. about President Donald Trump's conflicts of interest.
Radiolab – two-time Peabody Award-winning podcast attempts to approach broad, difficult topics such as "time" and "morality" in an accessible and light-hearted manner and with a distinctive audio production style.
New Sounds – guest musicians, from David Byrne to Meredith Monk, present performances and showcase new works from classical to folk and jazz.
Radio Rookies – provides teenagers with the tools and training to create radio stories about themselves, their communities and their world. It won a Peabody Award in 2005.
Fishko Files – Sara Fishko with sound-rich essays on art, culture, music and media, past and present.
The Takeaway – a weekday one-hour show, hosted by Tanzina Vega, co-produced with Public Radio Exchange.
Death, Sex & Money – Anna Sale talks to celebrities and regular people about relationships, money, family, work and making it all count.

Listenership and new media
WNYC has been an early adopter of new technologies including HD Radio, live audio streaming, and podcasting. RSS feeds and email newsletters link to archived audio of individual program segments. WNYC also makes some of its programming available on Sirius XM satellite radio.

See also 
WNYC (820 AM), WNYC-FM's sister station
WPXN-TV (channel 31, formerly WNYC-TV)
Media in New York City

References

External links

New York Public radio website
Broadcast Schedule (New York Public Radio)
WNYC historical profile (1978) at NY Radio News
Porter Anderson announces Challenge Grant for WQXR's Q2 Music (2011) by Victoria Mixon

WNYC-FM

NPR member stations
Peabody Award winners
Radio stations established in 1943
HD Radio stations
NYC-FM
NPR member networks
New York Public Radio
Hudson Square
1943 establishments in New York City
News and talk radio stations in the United States